Nancy Katharine Sandars,  (29 June 1914 – 20 November 2015) was a British archaeologist and prehistorian. As an independent scholar—she was never a university academic—she wrote a number of books and a popular version of the Epic of Gilgamesh.

Early life
Sandars was born on 29 June 1914 in The Manor House, Little Tew, Oxfordshire, England. Her parents were Lieutenant-Colonel Edward Sandars and Gertrude Sandars (née Phipps): her father was a British Army officer who had served in the Boer War and during World War I, and her mother served with the Voluntary Aid Detachment. Through her mother, she was a descendant of James Ramsay, the 18th Century anti-slavery campaigner.

Sandars was educated at home by a governess in her early years, and then at Wychwood School, an all-girls private school in Oxford. She was a sickly child, ill with tuberculosis; this had affected her eyes, but she was successfully treated at a sanatorium in Switzerland. As her education was interrupted by illness, she left school without any qualifications.

Career

Early archaeological career
Sandars took part in her first archaeological excavation in the 1930s after her sister had introduced her to Kathleen Kenyon. In 1939, Nancy joined Kenyon to work at her excavation of an Iron Age hill fort at The Wrekin, Shropshire. She had also been planning to join an excavation in Normandy run by Mortimer Wheeler, but was stopped by the outbreak of World War II. Instead, she went to London with Kenyon and assisted in the moving of artefacts at the Institute of Archaeology into its basement for protection.

War service
Sandars began World War II as a pacifist; she had been influenced by the poetry of Wilfred Owen and her memories of World War I. For the first few months of the war, she was a volunteer nurse at various hospitals in Oxfordshire.

Sandars's attitudes changed after experiencing The Blitz, and after the Fall of France in June 1940.
Following this change of perspective, she joined the Mechanised Transport Corps and became a motorcycle despatch rider. Because of blackout restrictions, the bike's lights were hooded and only emitted a small bead of light. Combined with the British weather, this could make riding a motorcycle at night treacherous. One time, Sandars crashed into a ditch, having mistaken a T-junction for a crossroads while riding almost blind. Another time, torrential rain made her engine short-circuited, shocking her, causing the bike to skid, and leaving her pinned under the wreckage; she was rescued by a passing fireman. The uniforms were inadequate, providing neither warmth not waterproofing; she would regularly offer soldiers pillion lifts so as to benefit from their body warmth. The women riders were not provided with helmets until Sandars father protested to the Ministry of Home Affairs; they were then swifty issued to all riders.

In 1942, she applied to and was accepted by the Women's Royal Naval Service (WRNS). Fluent in German, she was assigned to the Y service of the Government Code and Cypher School at Bletchley Park. Following training, she was posted to listening posts across the south coast of England:  to Looe, Cornwall from September to November 1943; to Lyme Regis, Dorset from November 1943 to February 1944; and finally to Abbotscliffe, between Dover and Folkestone in Kent from February to August 1944. She was posted to Abbotscliffe during the D-day (6 June 1944) landings across the English Channel. Her role as a wireless operator was to listen to intercepted radio transmissions from German E-Boats and aircraft within 30 miles of the British coastline. Working in tandem with other listening stations, they also used direction finding to establish the location of the enemy vessels. In one instance, she was listening in on a debate between German pilots as to whether or not to bomb the building in which she was stationed; they decided to save their bombs for London.

Sandars ended the war in the rank of petty officer, and was later added to the Bletchley Park Roll of Honour.

Post-war
After the end of World War II, Sandars decided to attend university. With no school qualifications, she had to take the "London Matric"; she passed and was therefore qualified for study at the University of London. In 1947, she entered the Institute of Archaeology to study for a postgraduate diploma 
in Western European archaeology. The course covered the Palaeolithic, and Iron Age periods, and also the archaeology of the Celts. The diploma took her three years to complete because of periods of illness.

From 1946 to 1948, Sandars, Richard J. C. Atkinson and Peggy Piggott, were involved in rescue excavations in Dorchester, revealing a number of previously unknown Neolithic monuments. By Easter 1948, the area had been overtaken by gravel-working. They used areal survey and the first instance of applying a resistivity survey to prehistoric monuments. The excavation was praised for using the "most modern methods" and for publishing "a document of permanent value which reflects great credit on the authors, each of whom played a leading part in the actual field investigations".

Sandars spent a year at the British School at Athens. She then undertook postgraduate research at St Hugh's College, Oxford. She worked with Christopher Hawkes, the then Professor of European Prehistory. She graduated from the University of Oxford with a Bachelor of Letters (BLitt) degree. Her thesis for her BLitt was edited and became her first book, Bronze Age Cultures in France.

In 1952, Sandars travelled to Greece to work on an excavation on the island of Chios. This dig was led by Sinclair Hood; Sandars and Hood had studied together, with both being at the Institute of Archaeology in 1947.

As part of her research, Sandars undertook a number of trips exploring archaeological sites throughout Europe. In 1954, she toured Greece, visiting Athens and Crete. In 1958, she once more toured Greece and also Turkey as part of research into the Aegean Bronze Age; she was accompanied by the anthropologist John Campbell and classical archaeologist Dorothea Gray. In 1960, she travelled to Romania and Bulgaria with Stuart Piggott, Terence Powell and John Cowen. She had received a grant from St Hugh's College, Oxford (her alma mater) to research the European Neolithic. As these countries were behind the Iron Curtain which few Western Europeans had been able to cross, she was required to report to the Foreign Office when she returned to England.

Sandars wrote a prose rendition of Epic of Gilgamesh that was published by Penguin Books in 1960. She used scholarly translations from the Akkadian by A. Heidel and E. A. Speiser and from the Sumerian by S. N. Kramer. Her version proved very popular and sold over one million copies.

Sandars continued her travels and research tours across Europe and the Middle East, visiting sites and museums. She published Prehistoric Art in Europe in the Pelican History of Art series in 1967, in which she rejected religious interpretations for cave art and championed an approach that instead focused on nature and illusion. He research interests moved in the second millennium BC, and she published Sea-Peoples: warriors of the ancient Mediterranean in 1978, looking at the Sea Peoples and the associated collapses of the great civilisations of the Mediterranean.

Honours
On 2 May 1957, Sandars was elected a Fellow of the Society of Antiquaries of London (FSA). In 1984, she was elected a Fellow of the British Academy (FBA).

Selected works

References

External links
Her website
The Lucid Past of Nancy Sandars - a biographical documentary about her life (75 mins, 2019)

1914 births
2015 deaths
British archaeologists
British centenarians
British women archaeologists
Prehistorians
Independent scholars
People from Oxfordshire (before 1974)
Former pacifists
Fellows of the British Academy
Fellows of the Society of Antiquaries of London
British women historians
Women centenarians